Berkhamsted Football Club is a football club from Berkhamsted, Hertfordshire, England.

History
The club was founded in 2009 after Berkhamsted Town folded, taking the name of a club that had played in the Herts County League in the early 20th century. They joined Division Two of the Spartan South Midlands League, winning it in their first season and earning promotion to Division One. The following season they won Division One with 107 points and were promoted to the Premier Division. Their points total was the highest in the National League System and saw the Herts FA award the club the  Stanley Rous Memorial Trophy.

The 2012–13 season saw Berkhamsted win the St Mary's Cup, beating Tring Athletic 3–1 in the final. In 2014–15 they won the Premier Division Cup, beating Colney Heath 5–3 on penalties after a 1–1 draw. The club won the Hertfordshire Charity Shield in 2016–17 with a 3–2 win over Tring Athletic in the final. In 2017–18 the club were runners-up in the Premier Division, earning promotion to Division One East of the Southern League. They were top of the league after 28 games in 2019–20 when the competition was abandoned due to the COVID-19 pandemic.

Ground
The club play at Broadwater, located between the Grand Union Canal and the West Coast Main Line. The ground has a seated stand on one side of the pitch, with an uncovered terrace adjacent to it. There is also covered terracing behind both goals.

Honours
Spartan South Midlands League
Division One champions 2010–11
Division Two champions 2009–10
Premier Division Cup winners 2014–15
St Mary's Cup
Winners 2013–14
Hertfordshire Charity Shield
Winners 2016–17

Records
Best FA Cup performance: Third qualifying round, 2022–23
Best FA Vase performance: Fifth round, 2015–16
Record attendance: 523 vs North Leigh, 26 April 2022
Biggest win: 12–1 vs Stotfold, FA Cup extra preliminary round, 5 August 2017
Heaviest defeat: 7–1 vs Hanwell Town, Spartan South Midlands League Premier Division, 2011–12; 6–0 vs Hemel Hempstead Town, St Mary's Cup, 2011–12
Most goals in a season: Matt Bateman, 44 in 2018–19

See also
Berkhamsted F.C. players

References

External links
Official website

F.C.
Football clubs in England
Football clubs in Hertfordshire
Association football clubs established in 2009
2009 establishments in England
Spartan South Midlands Football League
Southern Football League clubs